Eric Lavine (born 21 January 1971) is a retired Barbadian football player who played in the League of Ireland for over a decade. He has represented the Barbados national football team in World Cup qualifying matches.  His cousins Richard and Donovan also are Barbados internationals.

He was the first player to score four goals in the top division of the League of Ireland. He completed this milestone while playing for Galway United against Finn Harps on the opening day of the 2000/2001 season  . Jason Byrne later matched this achievement.

Joined Athlone Town in May 2006 .

He played for Oranmore in the premier division of the Galway & District League after his retirement from professional football.

Eric holds the FAI Youth Certificate & will be completing the UEFA 'B' Licence in 2009.

Honours
Longford Town
FAI Cup (2): 2003, 2004
League of Ireland Cup (1): 2004

Galway United
League of Ireland Cup (1): 1996-97

References

External links

 Eric Lavine Interview

1971 births
Living people
Barbadian footballers
Barbadian expatriate footballers
Barbados international footballers
Association football forwards
Galway United F.C. (1937–2011) players
Expatriate association footballers in the Republic of Ireland
Barbadian expatriate sportspeople in Ireland
Longford Town F.C. players
Athlone Town A.F.C. players
League of Ireland players
Sportspeople from Bridgetown
Pride of Gall Hill FC players